{{DISPLAYTITLE:Iota1 Cygni}}

Iota1 Cygni, Latinized from ι1 Cygni, is a probable binary star system in the northern constellation Cygnus, and is separated by less than a degree from its brighter visual neighbor, Iota2 Cygni. It is near the lower limit of visibility to the naked eye with an apparent visual magnitude of 5.75. The system is located approximately 387 light years away based on parallax, and it is drifting further away with a radial velocity of +2 km/s.

This is a candidate double-lined spectroscopic binary system. It has a stellar classification of A1V, suggesting the primary component is an A-type main-sequence star. The star is about 400 million years old with a moderate rotation rate, showing a projected rotational velocity of 52 km/s. It has 2.6 times the mass of the Sun and is radiating 74 times the Sun's luminosity from its photosphere at an effective temperature of 9,683 K.

References

A-type main-sequence stars
Spectroscopic binaries

Cygnus (constellation)
Cygni, Iota1
Durchmusterung objects
Cygni, 07
183534
095656
7408